Montrose (1884–1898) was an American Thoroughbred racehorse that is best remembered for winning the 1887 Kentucky Derby. He was bred in Kentucky at 	Col. Milton Young's McGrathiana Stud and purchased by the Labold brothers from Cincinnati, Ohio. Ridden by African American Isaac Lewis in the Derby, the colt was trained by former jockey John McGinty. 

Montrose also won the Morrissey Stakes and Great Western Handicap when he was a four-year-old and won the Kearney Stakes run in Saratoga Springs, New York as a five-year-old. Montrose died on July 30, 1898, at the age of 14 years at the farm of Allen W. Thurman in Columbus, Ohio.

Pedigree

References

1884 racehorse births
1898 racehorse deaths
Racehorses trained in the United States
Racehorses bred in Kentucky
Kentucky Derby winners
Thoroughbred family A23
Godolphin Arabian sire line